Webster County is the name of seven counties and a parish in the United States, each named for American politician Daniel Webster:

 Webster County, Georgia
 Webster County, Iowa
 Webster County, Kentucky
 Webster County, Mississippi
 Webster County, Missouri
 Webster County, Nebraska
 Webster County, West Virginia
 Webster Parish, Louisiana

County name disambiguation pages